The Sandcliff Hotel is an AA 3 star hotel located on the seafront in the English town of Cromer, within the county of Norfolk, United Kingdom.

Location 
The Sandcliff stands on the landward side of the A 149 coast road on the western outskirts of the town. It has commanding views across the esplanade to the sea, beach and the towns Victorian Pier.

Description 
The Sandcliff Hotel was designed by architect George John Skipper in 1894 and was built by Ambrose Fox and opened in 1895. The façades are of red brick interweaved with ornamental brickwork and well crafted panels of knapped flintwork.

References 

Cromer
Hotels in Cromer
Hotels in North Norfolk
Hotels in Norfolk
Hotels established in 1895
Grade II listed hotels
George Skipper buildings
1895 establishments in England